Cooley High is a 1975 American coming-of-age comedy-drama film that follows the narrative of high school seniors and best friends, Leroy "Preach" Jackson (Glynn Turman) and Richard "Cochise" Morris (Lawrence Hilton-Jacobs). Written by Eric Monte, directed by Michael Schultz, the film, primarily shot in Chicago, was a major hit at the box office, grossing over $13 million (USD). The light-hearted-turned-tragic storyline was complemented by a soundtrack featuring many Motown hits.

In a 40th-year retrospective by NPR in 2015, Cooley High was called a "classic of black cinema" and "a touchstone for filmmakers like John Singleton and Spike Lee."   In 2021, the film was selected for preservation in the United States National Film Registry by the Library of Congress for being "culturally, historically, or aesthetically significant".

Plot

In 1964 on Chicago's Near-North Side, Preach – an aspiring playwright – and Cochise – an all-city basketball champion – are best friends who are both celebrating the final weeks of their senior year with their classmates at Edwin G. Cooley Vocational High School. While sitting in class, Cochise sleeps while Preach comes up with the idea that Pooter, another classmate and friend, should fake a nosebleed so they can get out of class. As Preach and Pooter leave with the teacher's permission, Cochise, who is now awake, sneaks out the classroom's back door.

After getting out of class, the trio meet up with another classmate who is sitting outside the school. The group then hitch a ride from school by hanging on the back of a city bus. The group end up at Lincoln Park Zoo where they spend the day stealing snacks from the concession stand and antagonizing animals.

After spending a few hours at the zoo, the group heads back to the neighborhood via train. Once back, the group shoots a few basketball hoops with some locals before Pooter states he needs to return to school before closing to retrieve his books. The group ends up at Martha's, a local hangout where they run into another classmate on their way inside (Dorothy, who is giving a "Quarter" party at her house later that evening). While inside, Preach is shooting dice with two guys from the neighborhood, Stone and Robert.

During the dice game, they encounter one of Preach's classmates, Brenda, in whom Preach shows an immediate interest. After Preach is chased out of the hangout by the owner for gambling, the group splits up. Cochise arrives home, where he learns via mail that he has received a basketball scholarship to attend Grambling State University. The group meets up and binges on alcohol, celebrating Cochise's scholarship before heading off to Dorothy's house party.

Once at the party, Preach encounters Brenda again, who has no interest in him. While the party is going on, Preach retreats to a bedroom where Brenda is and the two discuss love poems. The party ends abruptly when another classmate named Damon shows up and spots Cochise dancing with his girlfriend, Loretta. This leads to a fight between the two.

Having trashed the house during the fight, the group retreats back to Martha's. The group, which consists of Cochise, Preach, Pooter and Tyrone, encounters Stone and Robert. The pair ride up in a Cadillac and convince Cochise and Preach to go for a joyride with them, driving through the neighborhood, downtown Chicago and the Gold Coast area with Stone at the wheel.

Preach convinces Stone to let him drive, which leads to attention from the police due to his bad driving. A chase leads from downtown into a garage at Navy Pier, in which they get away from the police, only to end up hitting a parked car with occupants inside. After the accident, they flee the vehicle, with Preach and Cochise running in one direction and Stone and Robert in another.

The next day, Cochise, Preach, Pooter, Tyrone, and Willie all decide to go the movies. However, the group is short on cash. Preach and Cochise approach two prostitutes, pretending to want countless sexual services. Later, they are both stating they are actually cops. While searching and threatening to arrest them, one of the women pays $10 to Preach to be let go. The other one notices that the police badge is a fake. After realizing their scam is blown, the two run off with the money.

The group then ends up at the movie theater where they watch Mothra vs. Godzilla. Cochise, Tyrone, and Preach are with their girlfriends, while Pooter is left venturing around the theater by himself. Upon finding a seat, he bumps into a man who gets confrontational. Another man intervenes on Pooter's behalf, which leads to a brawl between the Disciples and the Counts street gangs in the theater. The following day, Preach and Brenda spend a day together which leads to their having sex back at Preach's house. After learning that Cochise and Preach had an inside cash bet on Preach hooking up with her, Brenda leaves the house upset.

The following day at school, Cochise and Preach are arrested for being in the stolen car and are charged with Grand Theft Auto. While at the station, the pair are reunited with Stone and Robert, who are also being questioned. Mr. Mason, the boys' history teacher, persuades the police to release Preach and Cochise because of their clean records. Both Stone and Robert remain imprisoned due to them being repeat offenders.

Confused as to how they were let off the hook early, Preach and Cochise leave the holding area. Thinking that Preach and Cochise placed all the blame on them, Stone and Robert immediately hunt for both of them after being released from jail a few days later. While in school, Preach learns that Mr. Mason actually got them out of jail. He sets off to look for Cochise to tell him the information. In his pursuit of looking for Cochise, Preach runs into Cochise's cousin Jimmy Lee who takes him to his apartment. Once there, Preach finds him with his ex-girlfriend. Preach becomes angry and leaves.

Preach then retreats to Martha's. Spotted by Damon, he walks over to a table where Brenda is sitting and begins to apologize. While talking to Brenda, Preach overhears Damon speaking to Stone and Robert who have just walked into the hangout. As he sends Brenda out of the restaurant, urging her to meet him at the train station in 15 minutes, he tries to sneak out the back.

Preach's presence is then made known by Damon. Stone and Robert began taunting and chasing Preach around the restaurant. After spotting the confrontation, the hangout's owner intervenes. She forces both Stone and Robert out of her place with a meat cleaver while Preach is hiding in the restroom. Preach tries to sneak out the side door but is spotted by the pair who are waiting for him outside.

After evading them, Preach meets up with Brenda, where he learns from her that Cochise went to Martha's looking for him. Stone, Robert, and Damon ultimately find and catch Cochise on a side street. Together, the vengeful trio corner him and beat him severely, leaving him to die. Having been notified of the attack on Cochise, Preach frantically searches the streets. He finds his best friend's lifeless body lying face-down under an overpass. Using Cochise's untimely death as motivation and inspiration, Preach runs off after the funeral to pursue his dream of becoming a renowned Hollywood poet and writer. This ultimately makes both him and his newfound guardian angel proud.

Cast
 Glynn Turman as Leroy "Preach" Jackson
 Lawrence Hilton-Jacobs as Richard "Cochise" Morris
 Garrett Morris as Mr. Mason
 Cynthia Davis as Brenda
 Sherman Smith as Stone
 Norman Gibson as Robert
 Corin Rogers as Pooter
 Joseph Carter Wilson as Tyrone
 Maurice Marshall as Damon
 Steven Williams as Jimmy Lee
 Christine Jones as Sandra
 Jackie Taylor as Johnny Mae
 Juanita McConnell as Martha

Background
Monte based the film on his experiences attending the real-life Cooley Vocational High School (which closed in 1979) that served students from the Cabrini–Green public housing project on Chicago's north side. While the film was set in and around Cabrini–Green, it was primarily filmed at another Chicago-area housing project. Monte has said that he wrote the film to dispel myths about growing up in the projects: "I grew up in the Cabrini–Green housing project and I had one of the best times of my life, the most fun you can have while inhaling and exhaling".

Influence
Cooley High is seen as "changing the landscape" for black people in film, with its humane focus on the dreams of young inner-city black men, according to actor and film director Robert Townsend, who got his start in film with a one-line walk-on role in Cooley High.  Screenwriter and producer Larry Karaszewski holds that the film is also one of the great movies about real friendship, with outstanding performances by the male leads.  Boyz II Men named their debut album Cooleyhighharmony which featured a version of the song "It's So Hard to Say Goodbye to Yesterday" from the Cooley High soundtrack. The 1991 movie Boyz in the Hood was influenced by Cooley High. During the 40th anniversary of the film's release, nationally syndicated news station NPR published a story that discussed some of the fondest memories that the cast and crew shared of the film's production. Actor Sherman Smith (now using the professional name Rick Stone), who played the character of Stone in the film, recalled how he was approached by producers of the film while playing basketball one day. The crew members were looking for realistic gang members to be a part of the cast, so after being tipped off by police, producers offered Stone and his sidekick Norman Gibson, who played the character of Robert in the film, a role in the movie.

During this interview, screenwriter Eric Monte revealed that Cochise's untimely death in the film was inspired by a childhood friend of his who had been killed in a similar manner. Furthermore, just as Preach headed to Hollywood after the death of Cochise, Monte reveals that after his friend was murdered he hitchhiked his way to the west coast where he began working for shows such as Good Times and The Jeffersons. Unfortunately, not everyone from the film went on to live a life of success. Nearly two years after the film's release, Norman Gibson was gunned down outside of his neighborhood.

Production
The movie was filmed from October through November 1974 in Chicago, Illinois. Some scenes include other areas of Chicago such as Navy Pier and the Gold Coast area but primarily in and around the Cabrini-Green housing project on the near-north side. Interior school scenes were shot at Chicago's Providence St. Mel High School.

Reception
Cooley High was a critical and commercial success. Produced on a $750,000 budget, the film grossed $13 million at the domestic box office, making it one of the top 30 highest-grossing films of 1975.

Jack Slater of The New York Times was positive, writing, "To be black and to watch 'Cooley High' is to see one's vanished innocence—and beauty." Slater acknowledged that the movie was being hailed as "a black American Graffiti" but he thought Cooley High had "far more vitality and variety" than that film. Gene Siskel of the Chicago Tribune gave the film 3.5 stars out of 4 and wrote that the opening 10 minutes "leave you with the impression that 'Cooley High' is going to be nothing more than a series of routine and unfunny gags. But then the film's magic begins to work, and 'Cooley High' turns into a beguiling story that's affecting, lasting, and worth seeing more than once."

Arthur D. Murphy of Variety called it "a heartening comedy drama" with "a fine cast of young players" that were "well directed by Michael Schultz", adding that "you don't have to be black to enjoy it immensely." Kevin Thomas of the Los Angeles Times called it "a landmark movie, one of the year's most important and heartening pictures, that shows what the black film can be when creative talents are given an opportunity free of the strong sex and violence requirements of the exploitation formulae."

Jacqueline Trescott of The Washington Post was not so impressed, calling the film's nostalgia "deja vu and hackneyed, antiseptic even." She found several comic scenes to be "[w]ell-executed ... But these passages still lack a distinctive look and enough fire to raise 'Cooley' above the mediocre mark." Reviewing Cooley High for The Monthly Film Bulletin in 1977, Jonathan Rosenbaum said that "Michael Schultz's first feature can be viewed with hindsight as the promising debut of a very talented director, intermittently doing what he can with an uneven and somewhat routine script."

The film holds an 88% rating on Rotten Tomatoes based on reviews from 17 critics. Filmmaker Spike Lee included the film on his essential film list entitled List of Films All Aspiring Filmmakers Must See. The movie also ranked #23 on Entertainment Weeklys list of the 50 Best High School Movies. Metacritic gave the film a score of 72 based in 8 reviews, indicating "generally favorable reviews".

Television adaptation
ABC planned a television adaptation of Cooley High, but the pilot was poorly received, and Fred Silverman, the head of the network, asked the pilot's producers, TOY Productions, to redo the show as a sitcom with new characters and with a new title so as not to confuse it with Monte's film Cooley High. New writers were hired, cast changes made, and a switch from one-camera to three-camera filming delivered What's Happening!! to the network, where it ran from August 5, 1976, to April 28, 1979. The show and the production company were then purchased by Columbia Pictures Television in 1979 and ran in syndication for a number of years.

Home media release and possible remake
In 2000, Cooley High was released on DVD.  In 2010, it was digitized in High Definition (1080i) and broadcast on MGM HD.. The Criterion Collection is releasing the film on Blu-ray on December 13, 2022.

On July 19, 2016, it was reported that MGM was developing a remake of 1975 film Cooley High, with DeVon Franklin, Common and Tony Krantz. Seth Rosenfeld would write the screenplay.

See also
 List of American films of 1975
 What's Happening Now!!
 List of hood films

References

External links
 
 
 
 

1975 films
1970s coming-of-age comedy-drama films
1970s teen comedy-drama films
African-American films
American coming-of-age comedy-drama films
American high school films
American International Pictures films
American teen comedy-drama films
American teen romance films
1970s English-language films
Films adapted into television shows
Films directed by Michael Schultz
Films set in 1964
Films set in Chicago
Films shot in Chicago
Films produced by Steve Krantz
Teensploitation
United States National Film Registry films
1970s American films